The Karlsruhe University of Applied Sciences (or "Hochschule Karlsruhe"; formerly "FH Karlsruhe" ) is a university of applied sciences in Karlsruhe. It is the largest university of applied sciences in the state of Baden-Württemberg, offering both academic and professional higher education study programmes in engineering sciences, natural sciences, and business. Given the concentration of research centers and universities in and around Karlsruhe, the university of technology offers a wide range of courses on campus respected in the industry and academia.

It is ranked among the top universities of applied sciences or Fachhochschule in Germany with especially strong mechanical, electrical engineering, IT and Engineering with Business Studies programs.

History

The university's roots go back to 1878 and the founding of its predecessor, the Grand Duchy College of Building. In 1971, the university became a Fachhochschule (polytechnical university), a new type of institution for higher public education established with the specific objective of narrowing the gap between the theoretical and industrial world. The university attained its present form and was raised to the status of Hochschule (university) by the State of Baden-Württemberg.

Education and research
At present, a wide variety of degree prams are offered, primarily in engineering fields. In 1998, the university enrolled approximately 4,500 students. In the winter semester 2004/05, the university was able to welcome more than 6,000 students, who are taught by more than 150 full-time faculty and 300 part-time faculty. Their work is supported by some 200 technical and administrative staff.

Academic collaboration
 VIT University, India
 Universiti Malaysia Pahang, Malaysia - Collaboration to offer Bachelor of Mechatronics Engineering, Bachelor of Automotive Engineering

Applied research cooperations 
As a sub-project of the efeuCampus project funded by the EU and the state of Baden-Württemberg as an innovation centre for autonomous and urban freight logistics of efeuCampus Bruchsal GmbH, the Karlsruhe University of Applied Sciences started the efeuAcademy at the Institute for Energy Efficient Mobility (IEEM) in September 2019. The university is developing the knowledge database and is accompanying the project communicatively in public.

Faculties and departments
The university has six faculties and departments, offering the following study programs :

Faculty of Architecture and Civil Engineering (AB)
Architecture
Civil Engineering
Construction Management
Environmental Civil Engineering
Tri-national degree program Civil Engineering
Faculty of Management Science and Engineering (W)
Business Administration and Engineering
International Management
Master Robotics and Artificial Intelligence in Production
Technology Entrepreneurship
Tricontinental Master in Global Studies
Faculty of Computer Science and Business Information Systems (IWI)
Business Information Systems
Computer Science
Computer Science & Media
Data Science
International IT Business
Faculty of Mechanical Engineering and Mechatronics (MMT)
Automotive Engineering
Master Robotics and Artificial Intelligence in Production
Mechanical Engineering
Mechatronic and Micro-Mechatronic Systems
Mechatronics
Faculty of Electrical Engineering and Information Technology (EIT)
Electrical Engineering and Information Technology
Electromobility and Autonomous Systems
Environmental Instrumentation
Industrial Automation
Information Technology
Master Robotics and Artificial Intelligence in Production
Power Engineering and Renewable Energy
Sensor Systems Technology
Sensor Technology

References

External links
Karlsruhe University of Applied Sciences Homepage 

Universities of Applied Sciences in Germany
Universities and colleges in Karlsruhe
Educational institutions established in 1878
1878 establishments in Germany